The 1998 Goody's Headache Powder 500 was the 22nd stock car race of the 1998 NASCAR Winston Cup Series season and the 38th iteration of the event. The race was held on Saturday, August 22, 1998, in Bristol, Tennessee at Bristol Motor Speedway, a 0.533 miles (0.858 km) permanent oval-shaped racetrack. The race took the scheduled 500 laps to complete. At race's end, Roush Racing driver Mark Martin would dominate the late stages of the race to take his 27th career NASCAR Winston Cup Series victory and his fifth victory of the season. To fill out the podium, Roush Racing driver Jeff Burton and Penske-Kranefuss Racing driver Rusty Wallace would finish second and third, respectively.

Background 

The Bristol Motor Speedway, formerly known as Bristol International Raceway and Bristol Raceway, is a NASCAR short track venue located in Bristol, Tennessee. Constructed in 1960, it held its first NASCAR race on July 30, 1961. Despite its short length, Bristol is among the most popular tracks on the NASCAR schedule because of its distinct features, which include extraordinarily steep banking, an all concrete surface, two pit roads, and stadium-like seating. It has also been named one of the loudest NASCAR tracks.

Entry list 

 (R) denotes rookie driver.

Practice

First practice 
The first practice session was held on the morning of Friday, August 21.

Second practice 
The second practice session was held on the afternoon of Friday, August 21.

Final practice 
The final practice session, sometimes referred to as Happy Hour, was held on the afternoon Saturday, August 22.

Qualifying 
Qualifying was split into two rounds. The first round was held on Friday, August 21, at 5:30 PM EST. Each driver would have one lap to set a time. During the first round, the top 25 drivers in the round would be guaranteed a starting spot in the race. If a driver was not able to guarantee a spot in the first round, they had the option to scrub their time from the first round and try and run a faster lap time in a second round qualifying run, held on Saturday, August 22, at 12:30 PM . As with the first round, each driver would have one lap to set a time. On January 24, 1998, NASCAR would announce that the amount of provisionals given would be increased from last season. Positions 26-36 would be decided on time, while positions 37-43 would be based on provisionals. Six spots are awarded by the use of provisionals based on owner's points. The seventh is awarded to a past champion who has not otherwise qualified for the race. If no past champion needs the provisional, the next team in the owner points will be awarded a provisional.

Four drivers would fail to qualify: Steve Grissom, Dave Marcis, Ken Bouchard, and Gary Bradberry.

Full qualifying results

Race results

References 

1998 NASCAR Winston Cup Series
NASCAR races at Bristol Motor Speedway
August 1998 sports events in the United States
1998 in sports in Tennessee